Moor Lane, known as the Peninsula Stadium for sponsorship purposes, is a football ground in the Kersal area of Salford, Greater Manchester, England, which has a capacity of 5,108 and is the home of Salford City Football Club.

History
Salford City moved to Moor Lane in 1978, but it had been a venue for other sports for many years before; Manchester Rugby Club played there from 1908 until 1969.

In 2016, renovation work began, which saw its capacity rise from 1,600 to 5,108, including 2,246 seats.

In 2017, the renovated stadium was reopened by Sir Alex Ferguson, with Peninsula Business Services as sponsors. In 2019, the stadium hosted a semi—professional international fixture between England C and Wales C. The record attendance at the ground is 4,518 on 13 August 2019, a 3–0 loss to Leeds United in the EFL Cup first round.

Transport
The stadium is served by bus route 93 between Bury and Manchester, route 94 between Pilsworth and North Manchester General Hospital, route 95 between Bury and Salford Shopping Centre and nearby route 66 serving Eccles, Swinton, Pendlebury and Prestwich. It is served by route 92 during the evening.

References

English Football League venues
Football venues in England
History of Salford
Salford City F.C.
Sports venues in Salford
Sports venues in Greater Manchester
Rugby union stadiums in England
Rugby league stadiums in England
Swinton Lions